STEMCELL Technologies Inc., often abbreviated to STEMCELL, is a Canadian biotechnology company that develops, manufactures, and sells scientific instruments, reagents, and consumables. The company also markets education, custom manufacturing, and contract assay services for academic and industrial scientists. 

The company has offices in the United States, Europe, Asia, and Australia with the headquarter being in Vancouver, British Columbia, Canada.  The company distributes products to approximately 120 countries. Dr. Allen Eaves, the founder, currently serves as the President and CEO.

History 

Allen Eaves (MD, PhD, FRCPC), a hematologist and cancer researcher, co-founded the Terry Fox Laboratory (TFL) in Vancouver with his wife, hematologist and cancer researcher, Dr. Connie Eaves, in 1981. Allen Eaves’ research group at the TFL made their own standardized cell culture medium for growing hematopoietic stem cells in the lab. To help fund his blood cancer research program at the TFL, Eaves started selling this medium—named MethoCult™—to other research groups around the world. Eventually, the demand for MethoCult™ surpassed the capacity of Eaves’ research lab and the TFL. With a loan from Western Economic Diversification Canada and a mortgage on his house, Eaves purchased the business from the TFL and launched STEMCELL Technologies Inc. as an independent company on July 2, 1993.

Since its launch, STEMCELL’s products have expanded to include specialized cell culture and cell separation technologies and services used in stem cell, immunology, cancer, regenerative medicine, and cellular therapy research.

In 2018, STEMCELL received a $45 million grant from the Canadian and British Columbian governments toward building an Advanced Biologicals Manufacturing Facility (ABMF) in Burnaby, British Columbia. The ABMF will enable the scale-up of product manufacturing under good manufacturing practice (GMP) guidelines, to support the development of regenerative medicine and cell therapy products used in clinical trials.

Products 

STEMCELL develops and distributes cell culture media, cell separation systems, instruments, accessory products, and scientific services that are used by life sciences researchers.

Cell Culture Media and Supplements 

STEMCELL has developed culture media for the maintenance, differentiation, and reprogramming of different cell types. MethoCult™ medium, STEMCELL’s first product originating from the Terry Fox Laboratory, is a methylcellulose-based medium commonly used in hematopoietic colony-forming unit (CFU) assays. STEMCELL’s mTeSR™1 medium is a culture medium used for the maintenance of human pluripotent stem cell (hPSC) lines. STEMCELL has also developed semi-solid growth media for selecting and cloning cells. 

Organoids are three-dimensional cell cultures that incorporate some of the key features and functions of the represented organ. Through partnerships with pioneer institutes, including the Cincinnati Children’s Hospital Medical Center (USA), the Institute of Molecular Biotechnology (Austria), and Brigham and Women’s Hospital (USA), STEMCELL has commercialized media and reagent kits for the growth and differentiation of a variety of organoids, including kidney, brain, and intestinal organoids. 

In 2015, STEMCELL signed a license agreement with the Salk Institute for Biological Studies for the rights to commercialize BrainPhys™ Neuronal Medium. Invented by Dr. Cedric Bardy, now at Flinders University, this medium was developed to accurately mimic the environment experienced by neurons in the human brain and promote neuronal activity in vitro.

Cell Separation Technologies 

STEMCELL has developed technologies for isolating cells of interest from mixed populations. These include EasySep™, which uses magnetically labeled antibodies to capture specific cells from samples such as blood. This immunomagnetic cell separation process can also be automated using one of the company’s RoboSep™ instruments. STEMCELL also offers products for isolating cells using density gradient centrifugation, such as SepMate™ tubes for isolating peripheral blood mononuclear cells (PBMCs).

Primary and Cultured Cells 

STEMCELL sells a variety of cell products, including primary and cultured cells, blood and bone marrow products, and organoids. This includes cells from individuals with diseases, such as cancer, which are used for disease research and drug discovery.

References

External links

Biotechnology companies of Canada